Eleonora Czartoryska (1710-1795), was a Polish Princess, born Countess von Waldstein-Wartenberg. She was the ruler of the city of Radzymin from 1770 to 1790, where she built a palace and a park, commissioned a church designed by Jan Chrystian Kamsetzer and wrote a unique collection of laws on the city's governmental principles. She was married to Michał Fryderyk Czartoryski.

References

 Jan Wnuk "Księżna Eleonora Czartoryska - dziedziczka Radzymina" wyd. 2008

18th-century Polish nobility
18th-century Polish women
1795 deaths
1710 births
18th-century Polish–Lithuanian politicians
18th-century Polish–Lithuanian writers
Czartoryski family
18th-century women politicians